Johann Põlenik (1899 Pärnu - ?) was an Estonian politician. He was a member of II Riigikogu, representing the Workers' United Front. He was a member of the Riigikogu since 14 November 1924. He replaced Mihkel Pikkur. On 18 November 1924, he resigned his position and he was replaced by Juhan Maksim.

References

1899 births
Year of death missing
People from Pärnu
People from Kreis Pernau
Workers' United Front politicians
Members of the Riigikogu, 1923–1926